Shilihe station is an interchange station between Line 10, Line 14 and Line 17 of the Beijing Subway. Line 10 station opened on December 30, 2012. Line 14 station opened on December 26, 2015. Line 17 station opened on December 31, 2021, and is the current northern terminus for the line.

Station layout 
The line 10, line 14 and line 17 stations all have underground island platforms. Only the southbound platform of line 17 is in use.

Exits 
There are 10 exits, lettered A, B, D, E, G, H, J, K1, K2 and L. Exits D, G and L are accessible via elevators.

Gallery

References

Railway stations in China opened in 2012
Beijing Subway stations in Chaoyang District